Pilot Knob is an unincorporated community in Jennings Township, Crawford County, Indiana.

History
A post office was established at Pilot Knob in 1850, and remained in operation until it was discontinued in 1955. Pilot Knob is also the name of a nearby knob, or, prominent hill.

Geography

References

Unincorporated communities in Crawford County, Indiana
Unincorporated communities in Indiana